A text-based email client is an email client with its user interface being text-based, occupying a whole terminal screen. Other kind of email clients are GUI-based (cf. email client) or Web-based, see Webmail.

Text-based email clients may be useful for users with visual impairment or partial blindness allowing speech synthesis or text-to-speech software to read content to users. Text-based email clients also allow to manage communication via simple remote sessions, e. g. per SSH, for instance when it is not possible to install a local GUI-client and/or access mail via Web interface. Also users may prefer text-based user interfaces in general.

Typical features include:
 Editing various emails via tab support
 Configurable rendering of various MIME types, for instance OpenPGP encryption or HTML email 
 Vim-style keybindings
 Support for multiple accounts and protocols, e. g. IMAP, Maildir, SMTP, and sendmail
 UTF-8 support

List of text-based email clients 
Notable clients include:
 aerc
 cone
 Elm
 Emacs: Gnus, mu4e, rmail, Wanderlust
 Lumail
 mblaze
 meli
 Mutt
 NeoMutt
 pine
 alpine
 sup
 vim (using a plugin for himalaya)

Email software for the command line that does not occupy the whole screen (cf. TUI) include e. g. Cleancode eMail, CURL, himalaya, mail (Unix), mailx, MH, procmail, sendmail, and many others.

See also 
 Text-based web browser
 Comparison of email clients

References

Text mode
Email clients
Accessible information